Ida Engvoll (born 6 October 1985) is a Swedish actress. She has appeared in more than fifteen films since 2009.

Biography 
Engvoll was born in Söderhamn Municipality, Sweden, and grew up in Stråtjära in Hälsingland. She received  theater and music-oriented education at Torsbergsgymnasiet in Bollnäs, attended Wendelsberg Folk High School, and studied classical music at Birkagården (the residential academy founded by Natanael Beskow).

Engvoll then studied at the Swedish National Academy of Mime and Acting from 2007 to 2010. She also worked as co-editor of the theater theoretical anthology Att gestalta kön (To shape gender) at that time. 

Engvoll has played several acclaimed roles at Stockholm City Theater since 2010 and has also been active at the Royal Dramatic Theater and played in several films and TV series. She is known for starring in TV4's film adaptations of Åsa Larsson's series of books about lawyer Rebecca Martinsson. In 2015 she starred in the film A Man Called Ove.

Selected filmography

References

External links 

1985 births
Living people
Swedish film actresses